Abdul-Rasaq Wuraola (born August 24, 1984 in Offa) is a Nigerian football player currently with Kwara United F.C. of Ilorin.

Early life
Abdulrasaq Wuraola was born in Offa of Offa Local government area, his ambition was to play professional football abroad.

Professional career
Abdulrasaq Wuraola started playing football with the Ranchers Bees of Kaduna in 2000, Nigerian Universal Bank of Kaduna in 2001, Niger Tornadoes F.C. of Minna in 2002, Kwara Stars F.C. of Ilorin in 2003, Sharks F.C. Of Port-Harcourt in 2004 and Kwara United F.C. of Ilorin in 2005. In 2001 season, he played in the African Winners Cup tournament with Niger Tornadoes F.C.

References

1984 births
Living people
Nigerian footballers
Association football midfielders
Sharks F.C. players
Kwara United F.C. players
Ranchers Bees F.C. players
Niger Tornadoes F.C. players
Yoruba sportspeople
Sportspeople from Kwara State